Paul Cadéac (1918–2004) was a French film producer active in the post-Second World War era.  He also directed the 1954 crime film Quay of Blondes. He frequently collaborated with the director André Hunebelle.

Selected filmography
 Carrefour du crime (1948)
 Quay of Blondes (1954)
 Cadet Rousselle (1954)
 Mannequins of Paris (1956)
 Casino de Paris (1957)
 Les Misérables (1958)
 Shadow of Evil (1964)
 Fantômas se déchaîne (1965)
 OSS 117 Mission for a Killer (1965)
 Atout cœur à Tokyo pour OSS 117 (1966)
 The Two of Us (1967)

References

Bibliography
 Cowie, Peter & Elley, Derek . World Filmography: 1967. Fairleigh Dickinson University Press, 1977.
 Ivanova, Mariana . Cinema of Collaboration: DEFA Coproductions and International Exchange in Cold War Europe. Berghahn Books, 2019.
Kermabon, Jacques. Pathé: premier empire du cinéma. Centre Georges Pompidou, 1994.

External links

1918 births
2004 deaths
People from Agen
French film directors
French film producers